Galaxy 3 may refer to:

Samsung Galaxy 3, an Android smartphone produced by Samsung Electronics.
Galaxy 3 (satellite), a satellite belonging to the Intelsat's Galaxy fleet.